Elachista stabilella is a moth of the family Elachistidae found in Asia and Europe.

Description

Adults are on wing from April to May and again from June to July.

The larvae feed on bent (Agrostis species), common wild oat (Avena fatua), tor-gras (Brachypodium pinnatum), false-brome (Brachypodium sylvaticum), reedgrass (Calamagrostis species), tufted hairgrass (Deschampsia cespitosa), tall fescue (Festuca arundinacea), wood millet (Milium effusum) and Poa badensis. They mine the leaves of their host plant. The mine has the form of a long narrow yellowish corridor, descending from the leaf tip to the base. Three to four larvae can be found on a single leaf and several larvae may be found in a single mine. Pupation takes place outside of the mine. They are yellowish with a pale brown head. Larvae can be found from February to the end of May and again from June to July.

Distribution
It is found from Scandinavia to Switzerland and from Great Britain to Romania. It is also present on the Iberian Peninsula and Russia (Transbaikalia and western Siberia).

References

External links
 Elachista stabilella at UKmoths

stabilella
Moths described in 1858
Moths of Europe
Moths of Asia
Taxa named by Henry Tibbats Stainton